Mehmood Quraishy (born 4 February 1942), was a Kenyan cricketer who played three One day Internationals in the 1975 World Cup for East Africa. He also appeared in one first-class cricket match in the 1975 season, having earlier played one match for a team called "Coast Cricket Association XI" against a touring team from Pakistan International Airlines in 1964 at Mombasa.

References

1942 births
Living people
East African cricketers
East Africa One Day International cricketers
Kenyan cricketers
Cricketers at the 1975 Cricket World Cup
Coast Cricket Association XI cricketers